The 1925 Memorial Cup final was the seventh junior ice hockey championship of the Canadian Amateur Hockey Association. The George Richardson Memorial Trophy champions Toronto Aura Lee of the Ontario Hockey Association in Eastern Canada competed against the Abbott Cup champions Regina Pats of the South Saskatchewan Junior Hockey League in Western Canada. In a two-game, total goal series, held at the Arena Gardens in Toronto, Ontario, Regina won their 1st Memorial Cup, defeating Toronto 7 goals to 3.

Scores

Game 1: Regina 2-1 Toronto (OT)
Game 2: Regina 5-2 Toronto

Winning roster
Sly Acaster, Jack Crapper, Jack Cranstoun, Jack Cunning, Ken Doraty, Bert Dowie, Stan Fuller, Johnny Gottselig, Frank Ingram, Ike Morrison.  Coach: Al Ritchie

References

External links
 Memorial Cup
 Canadian Hockey League

Mem
Ice hockey competitions in Toronto
Memorial Cup tournaments
1920s in Toronto
1925 in Ontario